The  ("Law 99-586 of 12 July 1999 relating to the improvement and simplification of inter-communal cooperation"), commonly called the  ("Chevènement law") after its proposer Jean-Pierre Chevènement, is one of the principal laws encouraging inter-municipal cooperation in France.

 Community of communes
 Agglomeration community

References 

Local government in France
Law of France